Chad Frazier (born August 22, 1992) is an American professional basketball player for the KW Titans of the NBL Canada. He played college basketball at Gulf Coast State College and UAB.

College career 
Frazier played two seasons at Gulf Coast State College and averaged 15.6 points, 4.7 assists and 3.9 rebounds per game as a sophomore. He committed to Oklahoma State and Texas A&M before choosing UAB. Frazier was the 16th best junior college prospect according to JUCORecruiting.com. As a junior at UAB, Frazier averaged 17.7 points, 4.3 assists and 3.3 rebounds per game. He was named to the First Team All-Conference USA as well as the conference newcomer of the year. On April 17, 2014, Frazier got into an altercation with an unidentified female. He was later charged with third degree domestic violence. The charges against him were dropped on June 24 and Frazier was granted his release from UAB on July 28. On August 6, Frazier announced he was turning professional and not returning to college.

Professional career 
In July 2015, Frazier signed his first professional contract with the Greek team Nea Kifissia B.C. He rarely played on the team, and joined the Lithuanian club BC Nevėžis in February 2016. The following season, he joined the Cape Breton Highlanders of the National Basketball League of Canada. Frazier averaged 16.8 points, 5 assists and 4.3 rebounds per game for the Highlanders. The following season, he posted 16.1 points, 3.6 rebounds, and 2.7 assists per game for the Windsor Express.

On July 27, 2018, Frazier signed with Bakirkoy Basket of the Turkish Basketball First League. Frazier led Bakirkoy to the 2019 Turkish Basketball First League Finals, while averaging 13.2 points, 3.9 rebounds and 2.2 assists per game.

On August 13, 2019, Frazier signed a one-year deal with Maccabi Hod HaSharon of the Israeli National League. On August 28, 2019, he parted ways with Hod HaSharon due to an injury.

On July 27, 2020, Frazier signed with Aris Leeuwarden in the Dutch Basketball League.

References

External links
RealGM profile
EuroBasket Profile

1992 births
Living people
American expatriate basketball people in Canada
American expatriate basketball people in Greece
American expatriate basketball people in Lithuania
American expatriate basketball people in Turkey
American men's basketball players
Basketball players from Charlotte, North Carolina
BC Nevėžis players
Cape Breton Highlanders (basketball) players
Gulf Coast State College alumni
Junior college men's basketball players in the United States
KW Titans players
Nea Kifissia B.C. players
Aris Leeuwarden players
Dutch Basketball League players
Point guards
UAB Blazers men's basketball players
Windsor Express players